"Yo Te Quiero" (English: "I Love You") is a song by Wisin & Yandel, released as the second single from the album Los Vaqueros.

Remixes
There has been two official remixes, one featuring Latin pop singer Luis Fonsi and the other featuring R&B singer Jayko instead of Yandel. Both versions can be found on the album Los Vaqueros Wild Wild Mixes.

Chart positions

References

2007 singles
Wisin & Yandel songs
Luis Fonsi songs
Music videos directed by Jessy Terrero
2006 songs
Songs written by Wisin
Songs written by Yandel